Muna (stylized as MUNA) is an American indie pop band consisting of Katie Gavin, Josette Maskin, and Naomi McPherson. They released two studio albums with RCA Records, About U (2017) and Saves the World (2019), before signing with independent label Saddest Factory Records, which released their third studio album, Muna, in June 2022.

Career

2013–2019: Career beginnings, About U and Saves the World 
Based in Los Angeles, the trio met in college at the University of Southern California and began working together in 2013 with Maskin and McPherson playing together on guitars and Gavin adding synth bass and vocals. Gavin had introduced McPherson to Maskin. Gavin and Maskin were music majors, while McPherson double-majored in narrative studies and American studies & ethnicity. The two guitarists, Maskin and McPherson, had been used to playing ska and progressive rock, but settled on a different sound when their initial collaboration with singer Gavin resulted in a pop song.

Beginning their collaboration in an experimental mode, they evolved towards hooky electronic pop. In the summer of 2014, they self-released their debut EP, More Perfect, on Bandcamp and SoundCloud. Its success led to their signing by RCA Records in the US and Columbia Records in the UK. Gavin and McPherson dated for three years and broke up shortly after being signed. RCA released their self-produced debut major label EP, Loudspeaker, in May 2016. Their debut full-length album, About U, was released on February 3, 2017.

Dutch DJ/producer Tiësto remixed "Winterbreak" in May 2016. Muna played Lollapalooza 2016 in Chicago in July 2016, toured America with Grouplove in the fall of 2016, and made their late-night network television debut on November 7, 2016 on The Tonight Show Starring Jimmy Fallon. In June 2017, it was announced that the band would be the opening act on the North American and European tour dates for Harry Styles. In 2017, their song "I Know a Place" was featured in The Carmilla Movie, following the original web series based on Sheridan Le Fanu's novella of the same name. In 2018, Muna was featured playing "I Know a Place" live in the Netflix movie Alex Strangelove, which chronicles the sexual awakening of teen protagonist Alex Truelove.

In 2018, the band began work on their second full-length record. In June 2019, the band announced their second album, Saves the World, which was released on September 6, 2019. The album was preceded by its lead single, "Number One Fan," followed by the singles "Who," "Stayaway," and "Taken." Following their London shows at the Village Underground, it was announced that Muna would be returning to the UK for their Saves the World Tour in December 2019.

2020–present: Record label change and Muna 
In 2020, shortly after the onset of the COVID-19 pandemic, Muna were dropped by RCA for "not making enough money". It was then announced in May 2021, that Muna had signed with Phoebe Bridgers' record label Saddest Factory, which operates in partnership with Secretly Group's Dead Oceans. In September 2021, Muna released their single "Silk Chiffon" featuring Bridgers, their first since signing to the label. Rolling Stone called it a "buoyant track with an uncharacteristically bright declaration of queer love." The song was chosen by a number of publications for their year-end lists of 2021, including Rolling Stone, Consequence of Sound, and Line of Best Fit, who ranked it at number one. Muna later joined Kacey Musgraves's 15-city winter tour between January and February 2022. 

In March 2022, the band released the single "Anything But Me" and announced that their third studio album, self-titled Muna would be released on June 24, 2022, through Saddest Factory and Dead Oceans. The following month, they performed the single on Ellen DeGeneres' final season of her daytime talk show. The album's third single "Kind of Girl" was released in April 2022, alongside a Western-inspired video with the trio playing "with the gendered nature of the song". The band performed the song on The Tonight Show with Jimmy Fallon the following month. Following their self-titled third album's release, Muna was acclaimed by music critics who have scored it as the band's highest-rated album according to media aggregate site Metacritic. It became the band's first charting album on multiple charts including the UK Albums Chart, US Billboard 200 and in Australia and Scotland. The same day of release, Muna released the fourth single from the album "What I Want" with its music video. The trio also released their cover of Britney Spears' "Sometimes" (1999) for the Hulu LGBTQ American romantic comedy film Fire Island in June 2022.

Muna will be an opening act on multiple shows of the US leg of Taylor Swift's upcoming The Eras Tour, and the Australian leg of Lorde's Solar Power Tour. In March 2023, prior to the beginning of the Solar Power Tour, Muna performed to a sold-out crowd of 15,000 people at the closing ceremony of WorldPride Sydney, alongside Ava Max and Kim Petras.

Artistry 
All three members identify as queer and McPherson is non-binary. Initially wary of being pigeonholed as a "queer band", Muna later came to embrace the opportunity to use their musical fame to help inspire younger people to be comfortable with their identities. Their songs frequently address issues of sexuality and gender. They describe one early song, "So Special", as "an anthem for the slut-shamed girls of the world who have to assert their own value." According to McPherson, "It would have meant a lot to me when I was, say, 12, to know of someone in a band and think they were cool and know they were out." McPherson added, "I am out and I feel safe being out because the three of us are a little army for one another. I don't feel afraid to be myself. That makes me proud to be queer. That's the whole point of why we do this. We want a safe haven."

Awards and honors 
In June 2020, in honor of the 50th anniversary of the first LGBTQ pride parade, Queerty named Muna among the fifty heroes "leading the nation toward equality, acceptance, and dignity for all people".

Discography 

About U (2017)
Saves the World (2019)
Muna (2022)

References

External links 
 
 
 
 

2013 establishments in California
LGBT-themed musical groups
Musical groups established in 2013
Musical groups from Los Angeles
RCA Records artists
American indie pop groups
American synth-pop groups
American power pop groups
Electropop groups
University of Southern California people
Queer musicians
Dead Oceans artists